C. Pellew is a name, and may refer to:

Caroline Pellew (b. 1882), geneticist
Charles Pellew, 7th Viscount Exmouth (1863-1945), chemistry professor and British peer

See also
 , a point in Australia